Camouflage is a German synth-pop trio consisting of lead singer Marcus Meyn (b. May 2, 1966), Heiko Maile and Oliver Kreyssig. Their only Billboard Hot 100 hit was "The Great Commandment", which reached No. 59 in early 1989, and spent three weeks at No. 1 on the Dance Club Songs chart. They also had two minor dance hits in 1989.

History
In 1983, Heiko Maile, Marcus Meyn, Oliver Kreyssig, and Martin Kähling, four friends from Bietigheim-Bissingen, Germany, formed the band Licensed Technology. It was short lived, as Martin Kähling left in 1984. Soon after, the remaining three members renamed themselves "Camouflage", inspired by a Yellow Magic Orchestra song of the same name. The three young musicians set up their first studio in the basement of Heiko's parents' house, calling it "Boy's Factory". Their first live gigs at local music clubs soon followed. In 1985, Camouflage recorded two demo tapes at their studio, and the following year, the group won a local radio music contest, after a friend of theirs handed one of the demos in. A small Frankfurt music label, "Westside", showed interest in taking Camouflage on. There, the song "The Great Commandment" was recorded to be presented to bigger music companies. After considering offers from several record companies, Camouflage decided to sign a contract with Metronome.

Voices & Images, Methods of Silence (1987–1989)
Working with Axel Henninger, Camouflage re-recorded "The Great Commandment" in Axel's studio in 1987. The single was released in September of that year and rose to number 14 in the German charts. Their follow-up single "Strangers' Thoughts" was released in February 1988, rising to number 20. In March, Voices & Images, Camouflage's debut album, was released. The album topped the US Billboard Dance Charts twice having been played often by small independent radio stations. In New York, Heiko, Oli and Marcus signed a contract with the US label Atlantic that same year, releasing Voices & Images and the single "That Smiling Face" for the US market in the fall of 1988. In an old factory loft near their hometown, Heiko, Oli and Marcus set up "Boy's Factory 2", their new studio.

With producer Dan Lacksman of Telex, the band recorded a new album Methods of Silence at Synsound Studio in Brussels that following year. Now left to experiment more freely after the commercial success of their first album, Dan's recording work revealed an interesting mix of digital high-tech and out-dated studio equipment. The single "Love is a Shield" (No. 9 in German charts) stayed in the charts for over six months, and the album reached 13. After follow-up single "One Fine Day", the band embarked on their first live concert tour to great financial success. At the beginning of 1990, Oliver Kreyssig left the band for personal reasons.

Meanwhile, Areu Areu, Bodega Bohemia (1991–1993)
In October, Heiko and Marcus began work on the third album Meanwhile at the Black Barn Studio in England with producer Colin Thurston (who worked with Duran Duran, David Bowie and Talk Talk). Taking a different path, this album included real drums and conventional musical instruments played by guest musicians. The first single "Heaven (I Want You)" was released in Germany and the U.S., reaching 57 in their home country. Three months after their second German tour commenced, they released the album's second single, the double-A sided "This Day/Handsome."

In a 1995 interview, Marcus said "Naturally we would have preferred that things had gone differently. But it was our wish at the time to make this type of record. For that reason the situation was perfectly OK for us. Looking back today, we would have liked to have had better advice at the time, recommending against this drastic stylistic change in our music. But things went the way they did...."

After relocating to Hamburg in 1992, the duo founded their own music publishing company and studio, which saw the release of side project Areu Areu. During this time, they also began recording work for their fourth album. The goal with this album was to incorporate as many electronic influences as possible into their work. Their 1993 lead single "Suspicious Love" received radio air time and got rotation play on MTV, although it made only a minor chart placement. For this, the band faulted its record company Metronome for eschewing the band over other clients such as Ace of Base. As a result, Bodega Bohemia and the follow-on singles "Close (We Stroke the Flames)" and "Jealousy" were only released in Germany.

Failed opera project, Spice Crackers, We Stroke the Flames (1994–1997)
The next few years were not happy ones for the band. Heiko and Marcus signed a contract with the organizer of an opera project via mutual friends, but after investing more than a half year, visual concepts and demo recordings to the project, legal disputes between shareholders and organizers prevented any performance from taking place, and ensuing frustrations led the duo to consider leaving the music business entirely.

The manager of the band "Die Fantastischen Vier", Andreas "Bär" Läsker, signalled a desire to work with the band and helped them secure a recording contract with BMG (Germany) in 1994 for a fifth album. As the new contract allowed complete freedom of production, Heiko and Marcus revised music they had written for the failed opera project and added experimental and more creative approaches to the new tracks, including writing music inspired by science fiction films. However, the new album Spice Crackers, preceded by the single "Bad News" and chased by the single "X-Ray" was not a commercial success. The duo temporarily went separate ways to collaborate on various musical projects such as 1996's various artist compilation CD Treasury in which Camouflage contributed the song "Winter".

In 1997, Sony Music and Polydor released a compilation of past hits called We Stroke the Flames and a limited edition maxi single with previously released mixes of "Suspicious Love", "Handsome", and "Love is a Shield", albeit without input from Heiko and Marcus. However, this promising new contract ended without further releases for reasons not revealed. One good thing did come of this, however. Former band member Oliver Kreyssig, who had remained good friends with Heiko and Marcus, was by this time working with Polydor and helped with the artwork design of the album and single. This was his first professional involvement with the band since his departure, and ended with him rejoining the band as a member in 1999.

Thief, Sensor, Relocated (1999–2007)
Now a trio again, the band began work on a sixth studio album, beginning with the single "Thief". Although it climbed for two weeks in Germany, the band members continued on with their various side projects. In June 2000 Camouflage played their first live gig in many years in Freiberg.

In 2001 Polydor (which had bought the band's former label Metronome) released the compilation best-of album Rewind, for which Camouflage was finally allowed sufficient opportunity for input and song selection ideas. The limited version DVD included all of the video clips from the Metronome and BMG phases of the band's career. That year Polydor also released the single "You Were There" from dance project Resistance D featuring the vocals of Marcus. Its sound was much like that of Camouflage and subsequently caused a significant amount of confusion with fans.

Camouflage had by this time signed a new contract with Virgin Records and was still tentatively working on a sixth album. However, the band determined that in order to justify the release of an album they had to have at least one successful new single to precede it. At the suggestion of Virgin, the band attempted a comeback attempt with the release of a new version of their classic song "The Great Commandment". To avoid rights violations with their previous record company, vocals were also re-recorded. TGC, version 2.0 was produced by the London trio "Toy" with drums by Christian Eigner (who had previously toured with various electronics bands. TGC 2.0 climbed the charts for three weeks, but only reached No. 85. The disappointing result left little hope for a release of a sixth album with Virgin.

Because of this, the band decided to pursue other options with Polydor, culminating in the long delayed Sensor in 2003 – a long path from the 1999 single "Thief" until now. Sensor was produced by Rob Kirawn and Toy in London and Gerret Frerichs in Hamburg. While there wasn't a plan for how Sensor was intended to sound, they felt it was important to emphasize classic Camouflage songwriting strengths and return to an electronic presentation. The first single "Me and You" reached No. 53 in the German charts, while the album crested at No. 26. The Sensor tour took the band across Germany and for first time to Russia and other countries and to İstanbul, Turkey. The single "I Can't Feel You" only charted at No. 75. Meanwhile, Polydor underwent restructuring in the face of a declining recording industry and once again plans were shelved for additional singles or albums. Nevertheless, the band continued writing new songs.

In 2004, Camouflage signed a new contract with SPV and Heiko moved to Berlin to begin work on a new album with Oli and Marcus with Heiko taking on production responsibilities, resulting in the band's seventh studio album Relocated in 2006. Three singles were released from the album "Motif Sky", "Something Wrong" and "The Pleasure Remains", this last title only in Poland. The tour saw the band for the first time playing in South America and Mexico.

In 2007, Polydor released Archive#1 (Rare Tracks), a new Camouflage compilation of rare tracks and remixes on two discs.

The Box (1983–2013), Greyscale (2011–present)
In February 2014 Camouflage released a boxset "The Box 1983–2013", celebrating their 30 years together. The box contains remastered versions of all seven Camouflage studio albums, the Areu Areu EP, and two new Archive discs of live and demo recordings. The boxset is individually numbered, signed, and limited to 1000 copies. The band also celebrated their 30th anniversary at a live event in Dresden on 8 February 2014. There was a special exhibition before and after this live event where fans had the chance the view and photograph many materials, belongings, studio stuff from the beginning up to then.

Camouflage's eighth studio album Greyscale was due for release on 12 September 2014, with the single "Shine" due to be released shortly before the album. A tour to promote the album was also to begin in January 2015. "Shine", and another new song "Misery", were debuted during a live performance in 2011. Delays in the production of the album caused the release date to be postponed to 13 February 2015. The tour has also been postponed to March 2015.

On 19 December 2014, details were released for the new album, which was due for release on 6 March 2015 in Germany and on 27 March for other countries. Greyscale'''s lead single "Shine" was released on 20 February 2015. The album features a duet with Wolfsheim vocalist Peter Heppner, called "Count On Me" which was to be released as a second single on 9 October 2015.

Discography
Studio albums

Compilations
 Best of Camouflage: We Stroke the Flames (1997)
 Rewind – Best of 85–97 (2001)
 Archive#1 (Rare Tracks) (2007)
 The Singles (2014)
 The Box 1983–2013 (2014) (10 CD box-set)

Live albums
 Live in Dresden'' (2009) (Live album/DVD)

Other albums
 "Demo" (1985)

Singles

See also
 List of number-one dance hits (United States)
 List of artists who reached number one on the U.S. dance chart

References

External links
 Official website
 SHOUT! Online interview with Camouflage (July 2006)
 Areu Areu – Website of the Camouflage Side Project

German new wave musical groups
German synthpop groups
Musical groups established in 1984
Synth-pop new wave musical groups